Knut Johansson may refer to:
Knut Johansson (tug of war) (1888–1953), Swedish tug of war competitor
Knut Johansson (footballer, born 1892), Finnish footballer, died 1961
Knut Johansson (footballer, born 1902), Swedish footballer, died 1987
Knut Johansson (footballer, born 1918), Swedish footballer, died 2001